AsiaSat 5 is a Hong Kong communications satellite, which is operated by the Hong Kong based Asia Satellite Telecommunications Company (AsiaSat). It is positioned in geostationary orbit at a longitude of 100.5° East of the Greenwich Meridian, where it replaced the AsiaSat 2 satellite. It is used to provide fixed satellite services, including broadcasting, telephone and broadband very small aperture terminal (VSAT) communications, to Asia and the Pacific Ocean region.

Background 
The launch was originally scheduled to be conducted by Land Launch (SSL-1300LL satellite bus), using a Zenit-3SLB launch vehicle. The satellite was subsequently re-awarded to ILS after Land Launch were unable to guarantee that the satellite could be launched by August 2009, in order to be in orbit before AsiaSat 2 ceased operations.

Satellite description 
Space Systems/Loral (SS/L), announced in May 2005 that it has been chosen by AsiaSat. It carries 26 C-band and 14 Ku-band transponders.

Launch 
AsiaSat 5 was built by Space Systems/Loral, and is based on the LS-1300XS satellite bus. It is being launched by International Launch Services (ILS), using a Proton-M launch vehicle with a Briz-M upper stage. The launch was conducted from Site 200/39 at the Baikonur Cosmodrome in Kazakhstan, at 19:47:33 UTC on 11 August 2009. The Briz-M separated from the Proton-M nine minutes and forty one seconds into the flight, and AsiaSat 5 will separate from the Briz-M into a geosynchronous transfer orbit (GTO) nine hours and fifteen minutes after liftoff. It will then raise itself into its final geostationary orbit.

See also 

 AMC-14

References 

Spacecraft launched in 2009
AsiaSat satellites
Satellites using the SSL 1300 bus